Nabatieh, or Nabatîyé, is the city of the Nabatieh Governorate, in southern Lebanon. The population is not accurately known as no census has been taken in Lebanon since the 1930s; estimates range from 15,000 to 120,000. A 2006 population estimate by the now-closed German population site called World Gazetteer put the population at 100,541, which would make it the fifth largest city in Lebanon, after Tyre, Sidon, Tripoli, and Beirut according to those 2006 population estimates of Lebanese cities, but after an update in either 2007 or 2008 and calculations for the following years the 2013 population estimate turned out to be much lower at 36,593 and making the city the 11th largest in Lebanon behind Tyre, Bint Jbeil, Zahlé, Sidon, Baalbek, Jounieh, Tripoli and Beirut according those 2013 estimates. It is the main city in the Jabal Amel area and the chief center for both the mohafazat, or governorate, and the kaza, or canton both also called Nabatieh. Nabatieh is an important town both economically and culturally.

A market is held every Monday where traders and visitors from neighbouring villages gather in the centre of the town to exchange their goods in an area known in Arabic as the Souq Al Tanen. There are also branches of several banks, hospitals, restaurants and cultural centres of interest to tourists. Every year, the city commemorates the Battle of Karbala to remember the martyrdom of Imam al Husayn.

Nabatieh was the birthplace of several learned men, including linguist and Arab nationalist leader Ahmad Rida, historian Muhammad Jaber Al Safa, scientist Hassan Kamel Al-Sabbah (nephew of Ahmad Rida) and theologian Sheikh Ahmed Aref El-Zein.

Name
The town’s name originates with the Phoenician word meaning “the appearance.”

History
Nabatieh is known for its grottos, the most important of which are the grottos of Ich Al-Ghourab, “the crow’s nest,” and Maghar Mahalah, “the red spot.” Also of interest are some ancient rock tombs, Roman and Byzantine ruins, and two very old mosques.

In the 1596 tax records, it was named as  Nabatiyya al-Tahta, located in the Ottoman nahiya (subdistrict) of Sagif under the liwa' (district) of Safad, with a population of 151 households and 28 bachelors, all Muslim. The villagers paid taxes on goats and beehives, "occasional revenues", a press for olive oil or grape syrup, a market toll, and a fixed sum; a total of 9,030 akçe.

In 1875, Victor Guérin found Nabatieh et-Tahta ("The lower Nabatieh") to have 1,500 Metuali inhabitants, in addition to 300 Christians; mostly Greek Orthodox, but also some Maronites.

Following the 1982 Israeli invasion of southern Lebanon, in October 1983 an Israeli Army convoy accidentally drove into Nabatieh at the height of the Ashura celebrations. In the ensuing confrontation a jeep was overturned and set on fire. The soldiers responded with rifle fire and grenades and one person was killed and several wounded. This incident, as well as the assassination of Sheikh Ragheb Harb, is seen as the turning point in the Shia community’s relationship with the occupying Israelis.

After Israel’s withdrawal in 1985 Nabatieh was on the edge of the so-called security zone. 

On 24 August 1989 an IAF air strike on Ain Abu Suwar near Nabatieh killed nine people. Reports stated that the dead were refugees from the fighting in Beirut. In early December the same year Nabatieh was shelled for three days by the South Lebanon Army. Four people were killed and eighteen wounded.

On 17 May 1991 two bombs exploded in Nabatieh killing four people including a member of the South Lebanon Army. A statement from the Islamic Jihad Organization claimed responsibility.
Five months later the area around Nabatieh was subjected to eight days of shelling by the South Lebanon Army and the Israeli Army. The bombardment culminated on 1st November with a series of IAF airstrikes which destroyed two bridges between Nabatieh and Iqlim al Tuffah. The Israeli offensive coincided with the start of the Madrid Peace Conference.

During Operation Accountability, 25-31 July 1993, Nabatieh was extensively damaged by Israel artillery fire and airstrikes. Fifty-five towns and villages were heavily damaged during the offensive.

The Israeli Army shelled Nabatieh again on 21 March 1994; during the bombardment a school was hit killing a twelve year old girl and wounding twenty-two others. Earlier in the day Hezbollah had killed two Israeli soldiers and three SLA militiamen. Just over four months later, 4 August, the Israeli Air Force launched three airstrikes in the Nabatieh area which killed eight people and wounded eighteen. On 20 October Israeli shelling killed five people in Nabatieh. The day before the SLA had killed two civilians after their patrol hit a land mine. The shelling originated from the IDF military outpost base, Dabshe, which was situated on a hill overlooking Nabatieh. The following week, 29 October, twenty Hizbollah fighters overran and set fire to the base. A video later broadcast by al-Manar showing the Hezbollah flag flying over the Israeli base caused a sensation. At the time it was estimated that Nabatieh had a population of 60,000.

On 14 March 1995 the Lebanese cabinet held a symbolic session in Nabatieh to mark the 14th anniversary of the 1978 invasion. The meeting called for the implementation of the seventeen year old United Nations Security Council Resolution 425.
Later that year, 8 July, two teenage sisters and their four-year-old brother were killed when the town was hit by anti-personnel shells filled with steel darts. A weapon banned by the Geneva Conventions. It was reported that Prime Minister Yitzhak Rabin and Chief of Staff Amnon Shahak ‘reproved’ the unit involved. Ten rockets were fired into northern Israel.

During Operation Grapes of Wrath by the Israeli Army,  18 April 1996, nine members of one family in Nabatieh were killed in the seventeen day bombardment when their house was destroyed.

Historic structures

Beaufort Castle

On the top of a hill overlooking the southern Beqaa Valley towards Damascus stands Belfort or Beaufort castle, known to Arab travellers as Shqif Arnun, the word shqif being a Syriac term meaning high rock. There is no conclusive evidence for the age of this castle or for who built it.

The Crusaders repaired and fortified Beaufort Castle during the twelfth century and it became the most important fortress in Lebanon.

Mosques
Nabatieh has two historic mosques. One was built in the 16th century and lies in the centre of the town. Another, known as "the Mosque of the Prophet," dates to the Mamluk period and is located in Nabatieh al Fawqa.

Education
Mission laïque française Lycée Franco-Libanais Habbouche-Nabatieh is located few km to the north of the city. The National Evangelical School (Known Previously as American School for Girls in Nabatieh)   The Christian College Notre Dame des Soeurs Antonines is one of the oldest institutions in the city.

Demographics

The inhabitants of Nabatieh are predominantly Shi'a Muslims, with a significant minority of Greek Catholics (Melkites). The Nabatieh district has three representatives in the Lebanese government, all belonging to the Shi'a religion, in accordance with Lebanon's sectarian parliamentary system.

People from Nabatieh
Ahmad Rida (1872 – 1953)
Muhammad Jaber Al Safa  (1875 – 1945)
Ahmed Aref El-Zein  (1884 – 1960)
Hassan Kamel Al-Sabbah (1894 – 1935) 
Hisham Jaber  (1942 – )
Yassine Jaber  (1951- )

References

Bibliography

External links
Nabatiyeh Et Tahta, Localiban
النبطية | الرئيسية

 
Populated places in Nabatieh District